Apistosia is a genus of moths in the subfamily Arctiinae. The genus was erected by Jacob Hübner in 1823.

Species
 Apistosia humeralis Grote, 1867
 Apistosia judas Hübner, 1827
 Apistosia phaeoleuca Dognin, 1899
 Apistosia pogonoprocta Dognin, 1899
 Apistosia tenebrosa H. Druce, 1885

Former species
 Apistosia chionora Meyrick, 1886
 Apistosia subnigra Leech, 1899

References

Lithosiini
Moth genera